Pedro José Martín Moreno (born 16 January 1992) is a Spanish professional footballer who plays as a forward for Indian Super League club Odisha.

Club career

Atlético Madrid
Born in Málaga, Andalusia, Martín started playing football with hometown club Málaga CF, joining Atlético Madrid in 2008 at the age of 16. After two years in the youth academy he made his senior debut with the C team in the Tercera División and, after a good first year, he was called by first-team manager Gregorio Manzano for the 2011–12 pre-season, going on to score six goals. He was an unused substitute in both UEFA Europa League games against Strømsgodset IF, but eventually spent most of the campaign with the reserves in the Segunda División B.

Martín made his debut with the Colchoneros first team on 8 December 2011, replacing Pizzi midway through the second half of a 2–1 Copa del Rey defeat at Albacete Balompié (3–1 on aggregate). On 21 March of the following year, also at the Estadio Carlos Belmonte but with Atlético B, he scored in the last minute for a 2–1 win.

New coach Diego Simeone called Martín for various matches later in the season, as he continued to appear and score with the reserves. His first appearance in La Liga came on 29 April 2012, coming on for Tiago in the last minute of a 2–2 away draw against Real Betis. On 9 May he received a Europa League winner's medal following Atlético's victory over Athletic Bilbao, but did not leave the bench.Los supervivientes de Simeone (Simeone's survivors); Marca, 4 May 2018 (in Spanish)

Journeyman
On 29 January 2013, Martín was loaned to Segunda División side CD Numancia until the end of the season, and the move was extended for a further year on 12 July. On 26 August of the following year, he signed with CD Mirandés of the same league.

On 30 June 2015, Martín moved to CD Tenerife still in the second tier. On 1 February 2016, he joined RC Celta de Vigo, being assigned to the B team who competed in the third division.

Martín returned to Mirandés on 17 August 2016, now in a one-year loan deal. He continued to play in the lower leagues after being released, with Real Murcia, Lleida Esportiu, Gimnàstic de Tarragona and Atlético Sanluqueño CF.

Odisha
Martín moved abroad for the first time in July 2022, signing a one-year contract with Indian Super League club Odisha FC. He made his debut on 17 August, in a 6–0 away rout of NorthEast United FC in the group stage of the Durand Cup. He scored his first goal on 4 September, the only a win over Army Green in the same competition after an assist from Michael Soosairaj.

Career statistics
Club

HonoursAtlético Madrid'
UEFA Europa League: 2011–12

References

External links

1992 births
Living people
Spanish footballers
Footballers from Málaga
Association football forwards
La Liga players
Segunda División players
Segunda División B players
Tercera División players
Primera Federación players
Atlético Madrid C players
Atlético Madrid B players
Atlético Madrid footballers
CD Numancia players
CD Mirandés footballers
CD Tenerife players
Celta de Vigo B players
Real Murcia players
Lleida Esportiu footballers
Gimnàstic de Tarragona footballers
Atlético Sanluqueño CF players
UEFA Europa League winning players
Indian Super League players
Odisha FC players
Spanish expatriate footballers
Expatriate footballers in India
Spanish expatriate sportspeople in India